ScreenPlay is a television drama anthology series broadcast on BBC2 between 9 July 1986 and 27 October 1993.

Background 
After single-play anthology series went off the air, the BBC introduced several showcases for made-for-television, feature length filmed dramas, including ScreenPlay. Various writers and directors were utilized on the series. Writer Jimmy McGovern was hired by producer George Faber to pen a series five episode based upon the Merseyside needle exchange programme of the 1980s. The episode, directed by Gillies MacKinnon, was entitled Needle and featured Sean McKee, Emma Bird, and Pete Postlethwaite. The last episode of the series was titled "Boswell and Johnson's Tour of the Western Islands" and featured Robbie Coltrane as English writer Samuel Johnson, who in the autumn of 1773, visits the Hebrides off the north-west coast of Scotland. That episode was directed by John Byrne and co-starred John Sessions and Celia Imrie. Some scenes were shot at Lennoxlove House in East Lothian and others in the Scottish Borders.

Plays

Series 1 (1986)

Series 2 (1987)

Series 3 (1988)

Series 4 (1989)

Series 5 (1990)

Series 6 (1991)

Series 7 (1992)

Series 8 (1993)

Notable productions
 Cariani and the Courtesans (1987)
 You, Me & Marley (1992)

References

External links
 
 Screenplay on IMDb
 ScreenPlay at BBC Two Genome Project

 
1986 British television series debuts
1993 British television series endings
1980s British drama television series
1990s British drama television series
1980s British anthology television series
1990s British anthology television series
Samuel Johnson
British drama television series
BBC television dramas
Films shot in the Scottish Borders
Films shot in East Lothian
English-language television shows